The 1994–95 Meistriliiga season was the fifth season of the Meistriliiga, the top level of ice hockey in Estonia. Five teams participated in the league, and Kreenholm Narva won the championship.

Regular season

Playoffs

Semifinals 
 THK-88 Tallinn - Kreenholm Narva 0:3 (2:10, 1:2, 3:10)
 Monstera Tallinn - LNSK Narva 0:3 (5:7, 0:5, 0:5) (Forfeit)

3rd place
 THK-88 Tallinn - Monstera Tallinn 3:0 (5:0, 5:0, 5:0 ) (Forfeit)

Final
 Kreenholm Narva - LNSK Narva 5:0 (3:2, 11:3, 14:0, 11:2, 4:3)

External links
Season on hockeyarchives.info

Est
Meist
Meistriliiga (ice hockey) seasons